The Spokane Club Building-Legion Building is a historic five-story building in Spokane, Washington. It was designed by architect John K. Dow in the Renaissance Revival style, and built by Peter Peterson in 1901 for businessman F. Lewis Clark, the founder of the Spokane Club. It has been listed on the National Register of Historic Places since August 8, 1994.

References

National Register of Historic Places in Spokane County, Washington
Renaissance Revival architecture in Washington (state)
Buildings and structures completed in 1901